Maurice-Tréflé Custeau (March 10, 1916 – August 19, 1990) was a Canadian businessman and politician. He was a Member of the provincial legislature and a city councillor in Montreal, Quebec, Canada.

Background
He was born in Montreal, Quebec, on March 10, 1916 and was a businessman.

City Councillor
Custeau was appointed to the Montreal City Council by the Jeune Chambre de commerce de Montréal (Young Chamber of Commerce) and served from 1950 to 1954.

Member of the legislature

He successfully ran as a Union Nationale candidate in the district of Montréal–Jeanne-Mance in 1956 and was re-elected in 1960.

He served as Parliamentary Assistant from 1959 to 1960 and briefly as a Minister without Portfolio in 1960.

He lost his bid for re-election in 1962 against Liberal candidate Aimé Brisson.

He also ran in the district of Dorion in 1966, but lost again.

Death

Custeau died on August 19, 1990.

References

1916 births
1990 deaths
Businesspeople from Montreal
Montreal city councillors
Union Nationale (Quebec) MNAs